Waltz Across America is a 2000 album by the Canadian alt-country band Cowboy Junkies.

A live album, it was released on the band's independent label, Latent Recordings. Unlike most of the band's albums, it was not released in the United Kingdom. Another live album, In the Time Before Llamas, was released there in 2003.

Track listing

Personnel 
Cowboy Junkies
Margo Timmins – vocals
Michael Timmins – guitar
Alan Anton – bass
Peter Timmins – drums

Additional musicians
Jeff Bird - mandolin, electric mandolin, harmonica, 8 string bass, melodica, percussion
Linford Detweiler - piano, Hammond B3 organ
Karin Bergquist - backup vocals, acoustic guitar

References

External links 

Cowboy Junkies live albums
2000 live albums
Latent Recordings albums